T. V. Sankaranarayanan, (7 March 1945 – 2 September 2022) was an Indian Carnatic vocalist (South Indian classical singer), known for his music that stems from the style of his guru and maternal-uncle, Madurai Mani Iyer. TVS was awarded the Madras Music Academy's Sangeetha Kalanidhi in 2003.

Sankaranarayanan was particularly noted for easily reaching the upper notes.

Some of his musical disciples include R. Suryaprakash, his daughter Amruta Sankaranarayanan and his son Mahadevan Sankaranarayanan.

Early life and career

Sankaranarayanan was born in Mayiladuturai of Thanjavur district in the South Indian state of Tamil Nadu. His father, Vembu Iyer, was a disciple of vocalist Madurai Mani Iyer; his mother was Mani Iyer's sister. At age nine, Sankaranarayanan started learning music from his uncle (maamaa). Sankaranarayanan also learned from his father.

He made his debut on the concert platform in 1968 and then gradually established himself as a Carnatic vocalist.  He has performed in India and abroad and has several albums. In a profile published in the Financial Express, Subbudu, a music critic, once wrote: "Sankaranarayanan is indeed an asset to the Carnatic music world, where the tribe of good vocalists is dwindling."

Awards and honours

Gayaka Sikhamani by Bhairavi, USA in 1981
Swara Laya Ratnakara by Ramakrishnananda Saraswati of Sri Vidyasram, Rishikesh in 1986
Ganakalaratnam by Dr. Semmangudi Srinivasa Ayyar in 1987
Nadakanal By Nadakanal, Madras in 1987
Innisai Perarasu By Bharati Kalamandram, Toronto in 1981
Sangeetha Ratnakara By Vassar College in 1975
Swara Yoga Shironmani By Yoga Jivana Satsangha (International)in 1997
Sangeet Natak Akademi Award in 1990
Padma Bhushan by the Government of India in 2003
Sangeetha Kalanidhi by the Madras Music Academy in 2003
Sangeetha Kalasikhamani by The Indian Fine Arts Society in 2005
Vidhya Tapasvi by TAPAS Cultural Foundation in 2012

Image Gallery
Stages in concert

References

External links
On a joyous musical journey from The Hindu newspaper
 

1945 births
2022 deaths
Male Carnatic singers
Carnatic singers
Recipients of the Padma Bhushan in arts
Sangeetha Kalanidhi recipients
Singers from Tamil Nadu
People from Thanjavur district
21st-century Indian male classical singers
20th-century Indian male classical singers
Recipients of the Sangeet Natak Akademi Award